Cyphoderia is a genus of marine cercozoa. It used to include Cyphoderia margaritacea, which is now considered a synonym for C. ampulla.

References

Cercozoa genera
Imbricatea